Petroedmondia is a monotypic genus of flowering plants belonging to the family Apiaceae. It only contains one known species, Petroedmondia syriaca.

It is native to Iran, Iraq, Lebanon, Palestine, Syria and Turkey.
 
The genus name of Petroedmondia is in honour of Pierre Edmond Boissier (1810–1885), a Swiss prominent botanist, explorer and mathematician. The Latin specific epithet of syriaca means "coming from the Syria.
Both the genus and the species were first described and published in Fl. Iranica Vol.162 on page 167 in 1987.

References

Apioideae
Plants described in 1987
Flora of Western Asia
Monotypic Apioideae genera